Rosener is a surname. Notable people with the surname include:

Ann Rosener (1914–2012), American photojournalist
George Rosener (1884–1945), American actor
Jason Rosener (born 1975), American alpine skier
Werner Rosener, West German canoeist

See also
Rosner
Rossner